This is an incomplete list of March for Our Lives events that took place on March 24, 2018. The official March for Our Lives event in Washington, D.C., attracted a turnout of between 200,000 to 800,000 on March 24, 2018. This is a partial list. Overall turnout was estimated to be between 1.2 and 2 million people in the United States, making it one of the largest protests in American history.

United States
Listed below are locations where there have been rallies or marches in the U.S. in support of the March for Our Lives.

Worldwide
Listed below are marches outside the United States in support of the 2018 March for Our Lives.

References

External links 
 

March for Our Lives locations
2018 United States gun violence protests
March 2018 events in India
Protests in India